Hans Erich Freiherr von Campenhausen (16 December 1903 – 6 January 1989) was a German Baltic Protestant theologian. He is one of the most important Protestant ecclesiastical historians of the 20th century.

Life and work
Hans von Campenhausen came from the landowning nobility. Born in Rosenbeck, Livonia, Campenhausen's family escaped to Germany during the Russian Revolution. He graduated from high school in Heidelberg in 1922, and went on to study theology and history at the universities of Heidelberg and Marburg where he was particularly influenced by the theologians Rudolf Bultmann, Hans Freiherr von Soden and Martin Dibelius. In 1930 he was appointed to Göttingen.

Despite his signature to the Law for the Reconstruction of the Professional Civil Service von Campenhausen stood distantly opposed to National Socialism, and later joined the Confessing Church. From 1935, he was responsible for lectures and classes at the universities of Gießen, Greifswald, Göttingen, Kiel, Heidelberg and Vienna. Two appointments failed for political reasons: in 1935 he succeeded Heinrich Bornkamm's successor in Giessen and in 1937 succeeded Walther Köhler as professor of church history at the University of Heidelberg.

In 1945 he was appointed professor of church history in Heidelberg as the successor of his teacher, Hans von Schubert, and in 1946 was elected Rector. In Heidelberg, his most important works were Kirchliches Amt und geistliche Vollmacht in den ersten drei Jahrhunderten (1953) and Die Entstehung der christlichen Bibel (1968). His works on the historical Church Fathers, Griechische Kirchenväter (1955) and Lateinische Kirchenväter (1960) (Latin Church Fathers and Greek Church Fathers) have been translated into many languages, and constantly reprinted. He also published numerous studies on the Early Church. He was president of the Patristic Commission of the West German Academies of Science from its foundation in 1960 for twenty years.

A severe visual impairment made it increasingly difficult - and eventually impossible -  for him to do scientific work in his last years of life.

He was awarded honorary degrees from the universities of Göttingen, Oslo, St. Andrews, Uppsala and Vienna. For more than 40 years he was a member of the Heidelberg Academy of Sciences. He was a correspondent member of the British Academy and the Göttingen Academy of Science . He was also an honorary member of the American Academy of Arts and Sciences (1972).

Selected bibliography
 Ambrosius of Milan as a church politician. De Gruyter, Berlin, 1929.
 The Passion Sarcophage to the History of an Early Christian Scene. Marburg 1929.
 The idea of martyrdom in the old church. Vandenhoeck & Ruprecht, Göttingen, Germany 1936.
 Church office and spiritual authority in the first three centuries. Mohr, Tübingen 1953.
 Greek Church Fathers. Kohlhammer Verlag, Stuttgart, 1955; 8th ed. 1993,  .
 Latin Church Fathers. Kohlhammer Verlag, Stuttgart 1960; 7. unchanged edition 1995,  .
 From the early days of Christianity. Studies of the church history of the 1st and 2nd century. Mohr, Tübingen 1963.
 The origin of the Christian Bible. Mohr, Tübingen, 1968; Reprinted in 2003.
 Theologenspieß und -spaß. 1976,  .

References

 Bernd Moeller : Nekrolog Hans Freiherr from Campenhausen, 16.12.1903 to 6.1.1989. In: Historical Journal, 249, 1989, pp. 740–743.
 Adolf Martin Knight : Hans Frhr. v. Camphausen. In: Journal of Protestant Church Law 34, 1989, pp. 113–116.
 Adolf Martin Ritter: Hans von Campenhausen (16 December 1903-6-1 1989) - a Protestant church historian in his century. In: Heidelberger Jahrbücher 34, 1990, pp. 157–169.
 Adolf Martin Ritter: Hans of Campenhausen and Adolf von Harnack. In: Journal of Theology and Church, 87, 1990, pp. 323–339.
 Gottfried Seebaß : Hans Frhr. Of Campenhausen, 16.12.1903-6.1.1989. In: Jahrbuch der Heidelberger Academy of Sciences for 1990 , Heidelberg 1991, pp. 86–88.
 Thomas K. Kuhn : Hans of Campenhausen. In: Biographical-bibliographical bibliography of churches (BBKL). Volume 16, Bautz, Herzberg 1999, Sp. 253–254.
 Christoph Markschies (Hrsg.): Hans Freiherr von Campenhausen. Way, work and effect. Winter, Heidelberg 2008.

External links
 Literature from and about Hans von Campenhausen in the catalog of the German National Library
 Genealogical Manual of the Baltic Knights, Livonia, Görlitz 1929

German male non-fiction writers
20th-century German male writers
20th-century German historians
20th-century German Protestant theologians
1903 births
1989 deaths
People from Susz
Heidelberg University alumni
University of Marburg alumni
Academic staff of Heidelberg University
Corresponding Fellows of the British Academy